The Atlantic Coast Line Railroad’s Main Line was the backbone of the Atlantic Coast Line Railroad's network in the southeastern United States.  The main line ran from Richmond, Virginia to Port Tampa just southwest of Tampa, Florida, a distance of nearly 900 miles.  Along its route it passed through Petersburg, Rocky Mount, Florence, Charleston, Savannah, Jacksonville, and Orlando.  With the exception of a short 61-mile segment in Greater Orlando (which is now state-owned), the entire line is still owned by the Atlantic Coast Line's successor, CSX Transportation, and is still in service as their A Line.

History
By the time the Atlantic Coast Line Railroad (ACL) was officially created, track that would make up its main line had already been built by the company's predecessors.  The main line was built in the late 1800s by the following companies:
Richmond and Petersburg Railroad, Manchester, Virginia to Petersburg, Virginia
Petersburg Railroad, Petersburg to Weldon, North Carolina
Wilmington and Weldon Railroad, Weldon to Wilson, North Carolina
Fayetteville Cutoff, Wilson to Pee Dee, South Carolina
Wilmington and Manchester Railroad, Pee Dee to Florence, South Carolina
Northeastern Railroad, Florence to Charleston, South Carolina
Predecessors of the Plant System:
Ashley River Railroad, around Charleston
Charleston and Savannah Railroad, Charleston to Savannah, Georgia
Atlantic and Gulf Railroad, Savannah to Jesup, Georgia
Folkston Cutoff, Jesup to Folkston, Georgia
Waycross and Florida Railroad, Folkston to Georgia/Florida state line
East Florida Railway, state line to Jacksonville, Florida
Jacksonville, Tampa and Key West Railway, Jacksonville to Sanford, Florida
South Florida Railroad, Sanford to Port Tampa, Florida

The process to combine these individual railroads into a unified system began around 1898.  By 1900, the system north of Charleston was officially merged into the Atlantic Coast Line Railroad Company.  In 1902, the Atlantic Coast Line acquired the Plant System, which expanded the network into Georgia and Florida and nearly doubled the size of the network.

Due to increasing traffic and the Florida land boom of the 1920s, the ACL began work to double track 661 miles of the main line from Richmond to Jacksonville in 1922.  The double track was complete in 1925, two years ahead of schedule.  Automatic block signals were installed at the same time. In later years, much of the main line would be restored to single track with centralized traffic control and passing sidings.

The line carried many of the Atlantic Coast Line's passenger and freight trains though the years.  Many of the company's passenger trains on the main line were from the northeast to Florida, which included:  
Champion (New York - Tampa/St. Petersburg, and New York - Miami)
Everglades (New York – Jacksonville)
Florida Special (New York – Miami/St. Petersburg)
Gulf Coast Special (New York – Tampa/Ft. Myers/St. Petersburg)
Havana Special (New York – Key West, via the Florida East Coast Railway prior to the 1935 Labor Day hurricane.)
Miamian (Washington – Miami)
Vacationer (New York – Miami)

In 1967, the Atlantic Coast Line merged with their long-time rival, the Seaboard Air Line Railroad (SAL). The SAL also had a main line running from Richmond, Virginia to Tampa, Florida that was roughly parallel to the ACL's main line.  The two main lines crossed each other in Centralia, Savannah, Jacksonville, and Plant City.  After the merger was complete, the company was named the Seaboard Coast Line Railroad (SCL), who largely retained both main lines in the combined network.  To differentiate the two main lines, the Seaboard Coast Line designated the ACL's main line as the A Line and the SAL's main line as the S Line.  The letter A was added as a prefix to the mileposts on the A Line (A was also added to the beginning of the pre-existing letter prefixes on the ACL's branch lines).

In 1980, the Seaboard Coast Line's parent company merged with the Chessie System, creating the CSX Corporation.  The CSX Corporation initially operated the Chessie and Seaboard Systems separately until 1986, when they were merged into CSX Transportation.

Current operations
The full line from Richmond to Port Tampa is still in service.  In 2011, CSX sold a 61-mile segment from Deland, Florida to Poinciana, Florida in the Greater Orlando area to the Florida Department of Transportation, who now operates the SunRail commuter rail service on that segment.  Other than that, CSX still owns and operates the rest of the line.  Many CSX freight trains and Amtrak trains runs the line daily.  From north to south, the A Line is designated by CSX as the North End Subdivision, South End Subdivision, Charleston Subdivision, Savannah Subdivision, Nahunta Subdivision, Jacksonville Terminal Subdivision, Sanford Subdivision, Carters Subdivision, Lakeland Subdivision, and the Tampa Terminal Subdivision.

Historic Stations

References

Atlantic Coast Line Railroad